Richard C. Metz (May 29, 1908 – May 5, 1993) was an American professional golfer.

Metz won 10 times on the PGA Tour in the 1930s and 1940s. He had continued success as a senior golfer winning the Senior PGA Championship and World Seniors Championship in 1960.

Metz married actress Jean Chatburn on November 2, 1939. He was also a cattle rancher from the 1950s until his death. He was born and died in Arkansas City, Kansas.

Professional wins

PGA Tour wins (10)
1935 (1) Mid-South Pro-Pro Bestball (with Gene Kunes)
1937 (2) Thomasville Open, Hollywood Open
1938 (1) Miami International Four-Ball (with Ky Laffoon)
1939 (4) Oakland Open, Asheville Open, St. Paul Open, San Francisco National Match Play Open
1940 (1) Chicago Open
1949 (1) Cedar Rapids Open

Other wins
1933 Pennsylvania Open Championship
1939 Illinois PGA Championship

Senior wins (2)
1960 PGA Seniors' Championship, World Senior Championship

Results in major championships

Note: Metz never played in The Open Championship.

NYF = tournament not yet founded
NT = no tournament
WD = withdrew
CUT = missed the half-way cut
R64, R32, R16, QF, SF = Round in which player lost in PGA Championship match play
"T" indicates a tie for a place

Summary

Most consecutive cuts made – 27 (1934 PGA – 1948 Masters)
Longest streak of top-10s – 3 (1938 Masters – 1938 PGA)

See also
List of golfers with most PGA Tour wins

External links

American male golfers
PGA Tour golfers
Golfers from Kansas
People from Arkansas City, Kansas
1908 births
1993 deaths